Belmar may refer to:

Belmar, Nebraska, an unincorporated community
Belmar, New Jersey, a borough in Monmouth County, New Jersey, United States
Belmar, Louisville, a neighborhood in Louisville, Kentucky
Belmar (horse) (foaled 1892), an American thoroughbred racehorse
Belmar (Lakewood) - a neighborhood in Lakewood, Colorado
Lincoln–Lemington–Belmar, a neighborhood in Pittsburgh, Pennsylvania, United States

People with the surname
Nazario Belmar (1919–1980), Spanish footballer, producer and lawyer
Richard Belmar (born 1979), British man who was held in extrajudicial detention in the United States's Guantanamo Bay detention camps